Billwerder is a quarter of Hamburg, Germany, in the borough of Bergedorf. It is located on the northwestern border of the borough adjacent to the borough of Hamburg-Mitte. At the same time Billwerder means a greater area south of the river Bille.

Name
The name derives from Bilnawerthere, meaning island in the Bille. A Werder is an island between rivers or other bodies of water, in this case Bille and Elbe/Dove Elbe rivers. Until 1949 Billwerder was also named Billwärder an der Elbe.

Geography
Billwerder borders the quarters of Lohbrügge, Bergedorf, Neuallermöhe, Allermöhe, Moorfleet, Billbrook, and Billstedt.

Billwerder is part of the Marschlande (marshlands) area in Hamburg, which is known for its wet and muddy grounds. It is sparsely populated. Billwerder's landscape is formed by the transition of rural Vierlande into the industrial and commercial areas near the Port of Hamburg, such as nearby Billbrook. Billwerder is largely characterized by horticulture and agriculture, on the other hand, however, commercial environments, the Federal Highway 1, and the Hamburg-Bergedorf railway line, the first railway line in Northern Germany, are also part of the quarter.

In 2017 the city of Hamburg started planning the new quarter Oberbillwerder which is located at the Allermöhe station.

Politics
These are the results of Billwerder in the Hamburg state election:

Transportation
The S-Bahn stations of Billwerder-Moorfleet and Mittlerer Landweg are located in the quarter.

References

External links

 Billwerder, Hamburg.de

Quarters of Hamburg
Bergedorf